Joseph Keith Lightner (July 25, 1900 – June 6, 1988) was an American football player and coach.  He served as the 18th head football coach at Dickinson College in Carlisle, Pennsylvania and he held that position for three seasons, from 1923 until 1925.   His record at Dickinson was 17–7–2.  Lightner took over the second half of the 1923 season after B. Russell Murphy resigned with an 0–2 start.

Professional athlete
Lightner played football professionally in 1922 for the Frankford Yellow Jackets before the team joined the National Football League. He also played baseball professionally for the Reading team in the International League from 1921 (as "William Lightner") to 1925.

References

External links
 
 

1900 births
1988 deaths
American football halfbacks
Baseball outfielders
Dickinson Red Devils football coaches
Frankford Yellow Jackets players
Harrisburg Senators players
Penn State Nittany Lions baseball players
Penn State Nittany Lions football players
Reading Keystones players
People from Perry County, Pennsylvania
Players of American football from Pennsylvania
Baseball players from Pennsylvania